The term Mirror cell may be used as:

 Colloquial term for Mirror neuron, a specialized brain neuron
 Mirror support cell which supports the primary mirror in a reflecting telescope